Nalujuk Night is a Canadian short documentary film, directed by Jennie Williams and released in 2021. The film documents the tradition of "Nalujuk Night" among Inuit of Nunatsiavut, an annual event in which Nalujuit—"startling figures that come from the Eastern sea ice, dressed in torn and tattered clothing, animal skins and furs"—walk through the town, where they reward good children and chase bad children.

Created as part of the National Film Board of Canada's Labrador Documentary Project to foster the creation of documentary films about Inuit culture from an Inuit perspective, the film premiered at the 2021 FIN Atlantic Film Festival.

The film won the Canadian Screen Award for Best Short Documentary at the 10th Canadian Screen Awards in 2022.

References

External links

2021 films
2021 short documentary films
Canadian short documentary films
Inuit films
Films shot in Newfoundland and Labrador
National Film Board of Canada documentaries
Documentary films about Inuit in Canada
Best Short Documentary Film Genie and Canadian Screen Award winners
2020s Canadian films
Films set in Newfoundland and Labrador
Films about observances